This article now covers all of the Pairs and Individuals events in the World Bridge Federation youth program. World Junior Teams Championship covers all of the Teams events.

The World Junior Pairs Championship is a bridge competition organized by the World Bridge Federation. It was inaugurated 1995 in Ghent, Belgium, when it incorporated the European Junior Pairs Championship inaugurated 1991. Officially the Juniors and Youngsters Pairs Championships (jointly, Youth Pairs) are biennial in odd years, although there are parallel contests in some even years.

Junior Pairs is open to players who are "under 26" years old at the end of the calendar year (u-26, U26). So they may celebrate their 25th birthdays during the year; Junior competition during calendar 2011 is restricted to players born 1986 and later. The parallel Youngsters Pairs is for players under 21 (u-21, U21).

The next rendition in Opatija, Croatia, concludes 30 August 2011.

The 2011 Junior Pairs is a three-day matchpoints tournament with 61 entries. Only five are transnational.

Although the Junior Pairs is the long-running event at the Youth Congress, it takes second place to teams tournament, with a big step back from 2009 to 2011. The first rendition scheduled five-day teams followed by four-day pairs, Saturday to Sunday in all. The second scheduled five-day main event for teams, followed by one day to conclude the consolation event for teams (all that Monday to Saturday), and three-day pairs, Sunday to Tuesday.

Scope

The Junior Pairs event (or tournament in a narrow sense) became part of the plural "World Youth Pairs Championships" in 2003 when a tournament for under-21 Youngster Pairs was initiated, pending sufficient entries by eligible players. Officially, that meet was discontinued and its two main events became part of the "World Youth Congress" in 2009, when teams events were added to the youth program for odd-number years, contested immediately prior to the older events for pairs.

Odd-year teams events are distinct from the older series of teams championships (now biennial in even years) and even-year pairs events are distinct from the older series of pairs championships (now biennial in odd years). Some conditions differ.

This article covers all "world championships" for youth pairs or individuals while World Junior Teams Championship covers all "world championships" for youth teams.

Results

List "to date"
The World Bridge Federation calls the World Youth Congress—biennial in odd years, getting underway in 2009 and 2011— "the generalization of the World Youth Pairs Championships, inaugurated in Ghent, Belgium in 1995"—referring to the 'Juniors Pairs' which expanded to plural 'Youth' championships with Juniors and Youngsters flights in 2006.

The Youngsters event is sometimes called "Schools", as it was called in Europe. In fact a Schools championship was officially part of the 2003 Junior Pairs: the Schools medalists were the first three eligible pairs in the unified field.

Current definitions of u-26 and u-21 players may have evolved during the history of the WBF youth program but such details are not covered here. (The previous reference calls the Schools "up to 20" which suggests a difference.)

Juniors

The first official world champions, Geir Helgemo and Boye Brogeland of Norway, were the most successful in Open play through 2011. Helgemo had already played on Norway's second-place open team in 1993, and both would play in the Bermuda Bowls 1997 to 2007, as Norway placed third, fourth, second, fourth, out of the money, and finally first.

For the first rendition as a WBF event, European pairs held the first 44 places, except only one France—Guadeloupe pair in 25th place.

*The 2003 field of 189 pairs included the under-21 stratum covered below.

After 2006 the European Youth Pairs Championships were rejuvenated as a separate event, contested in even-number years, now restricted to European national pairs (two players from the same EBL member). European pairs had won all of the medals in six renditions of the world event, with only one transnational pair among the 18 medalists (1997 silver), and they have continued to win at the world level. 

The "World" event is now contested in odd years at the World Youth Bridge Congress.

Officially the 2006 and 2009 events are now the 6th and 7th in the Junior MP Pairs series. The 2009 events were reported as part of the "1st World Youth Congress", much as the 2008 and 2010 events were reported as part of the 1st World Mind Sports Games and the World Bridge Series.

[quote] The 1st World Youth Bridge Congress was held in Istanbul,  Turkey, from  15 to 23 August 2009, hosted at the Yeditepe University. Young players from all member countries of the World Bridge Federation were invited to participate in this new competition, designed to be a massive event. Accordingly, transnational combinations were allowed in all events, and there were no restrictions on the number of players who could participate from any single country.

The new congress included various teams and pairs competitions. Teams were played according to the Swiss format, as well as Board-A-match. There were Match Point and IMP pairs. The championships were open to players born in 1984 or later (Under-26), while it was intended that players born in 1989 or later would form a separate category (Under-21) in all events, if the entry was sufficient.

The World Youth Pairs Championships have been discontinued, as they are now included in the World Youth Congress.

Youngsters

The 2003 "Schools" medalists were the highest ranking eligible pairs in the unified field. They ranked 5, 21, and 37 among the 189 Juniors pairs from 27 countries. About one quarter of the field was eligible for the Schools medals.

In 2006 there were 210 Juniors pairs from 34 countries in 5 of 8 world zones. The Schools pairs competed separately for the first time, which the WBF calls the first championship in its Youngsters category. Six of the top twelve pairs were from Poland including the gold and silver medalists.

Contemporary reporting calls the Schools stratum in 2003 and Schools flight in 2006 successful, with 40-odd and 68 participants. Yet WBF lists only the single official rendition in 2006. The 2009 Congress homepage implies that entries by Youngsters must have been too few.

With merely 61 entries, the 2011 Junior Pairs is smaller than the separate event for Youngsters in 2006, when the two flights saw 142 and 68 pairs.

European Junior Pairs

The European event was held 1991 in Fiesch, Switzerland and 1993 in Oberreifenberg, Germany, then incorporated in the new World event. (The field counts finalists only.)

For six cycles 1995 to 2006, the European championships were incorporated in the World championships. The European champion was the highest ranking pair with both players from Europe, second place in Europe was the second-ranking such pair, and so on. In fact, all eighteen of the World medalists were European pairs.

European Youth again, 2008 9th European Youth Pairs Championship, 2008. EBL.
and 2010 10th European Youth Pairs Championship, 2010. EBL.

The predecessor European event was held 1991 in Fiesch, Switzerland and 1993 in Oberreifenberg, Schmitten, Germany. ("Oberreifenberg", German Wikipedia)

Even years
Youth pairs tournaments contested in even-number years are officially separate from the "World Youth Pairs" series. At the official world championship level, the recent instances have been under-28 pairs and individuals tournaments at the first "World Bridge Games" in 2008. There were no major events for youth pairs or individuals at the renamed "World Bridge Series" in 2010.

Youth events at the first "World Bridge Games" concluded with a two-day tournament for Individuals under age 28. The medal flight was restricted to 52 players who qualified in the preceding Pairs tournament.

See also
Bridge at the 1st World Mind Sports Games
World Junior Teams Championship

Notes

References

External links
European Youth Pairs Championships at the European Bridge League
World Championships & Events at the World Bridge Federation —tabular overview
Youth Bridge program overview at the World Bridge Federation

Junior Pairs